Title 46 is the portion of the Code of Federal Regulations that governs shipping within the United States for the United States Coast Guard, the United States Maritime Administration, and the United States Maritime Commission.  It is available in digital or printed form.

Title 46 and Title 33 of the Code of Federal Regulations are usually consulted by Classification societies, engineering firms, deck officers on oceangoing vessels, and marine engineers.

It is divided into four chapters:
 Chapter I — United States Coast Guard,
 Chapter II — United States Maritime Administration,
 Chapter III — United States Coast Guard (Great Lakes Pilotage), and
 Chapter IV — United States Maritime Commission.

Chapter I

Chapter II

Chapter III

Chapter IV

External links
 Title 46 of the Code of Federal Regulations

United States admiralty law
 46